The 2015–16 Serie A (known as the Serie A TIM for sponsorship reasons) was the 114th season of top-tier Italian football, the 84th in a round-robin tournament, and the 6th since its organization under a league committee separate from Serie B. Juventus were the defending champions. The campaign began on 22 August 2015 and ended on 15 May 2016.

On 25 April 2016, Juventus succeeded in defending their title for the fifth consecutive season, after second placed Napoli lost to Roma, giving Juventus a 12-point lead with only three games left.

Events

On 28 April 2015 Carpi obtained its first promotion ever to Serie A, after debuting in Serie B the year before, becoming the 64th team to participate in Serie A since the 1929–30 season. On 16 May, Frosinone also earned its first promotion to Serie A, becoming the 65th to participate. On 9 June 2015 Bologna won Serie B play-off, returning to the Serie A after just one year.

This season of Serie A was the first season to have goal-line technology implemented after severe complaints from various teams' general managers (first Adriano Galliani) in relation to controversial ghost goals during recent seasons of Serie A.

On 20 March 2016, Gianluigi Buffon broke the previous record of Sebastiano Rossi (929 minutes) by setting a longer period of 974 minutes without conceding a goal.

On 14 May, Gonzalo Higuaín broke Gunnar Nordahl's record for most goals scored in Serie A (20 teams championship) in a season (35 in 1949–50) and equaled Gino Rossetti's record in 1928–29 (that was composed of 32 teams, instead) by scoring 36 goals and winning the Capocannoniere.

Three Serie A icons also retired at the end of the season; the Verona captain Luca Toni, who scored 157 goals in 324 league appearances and was twice the league's top scorer, as well as Gianpaolo Bellini, the left-back who spent his entire career with Atalanta, making 435 appearances with the club. Both players also scored in their final games with their clubs on 8 May 2016, Toni in a 2–1 win over champions Juventus and Bellini in a 1–1 draw with Udinese; and on 14 May, Christian Abbiati for Milan in the last fixture of the season at home against Roma, however, he did not get any playing time, totaling 281 league appearances for the club.

Teams

Stadiums and locations

Personnel and kits

 Additionally, referee kits are now being made by Diadora, and Nike has a new match ball, the Ordem Serie A.
†Torino to appear Nyalakan Nyali branding to promote Suzuki branding in Indonesia.

Managerial changes

League table

Results

Attendance data

Season statistics

Top goalscorers

Hat-tricks

References

Serie A seasons
Italy
1